Close Encounters is the third album by Gene Page. It was produced by  Billy Page and Gene Page.

Track listing
"Close Encounters of the Third Kind"  (John Williams) 4:18
"Theme From Star Trek"  (Alexander Courage) 3:22
"C E 3 K"  (John Williams) 0:14
"Moonglow and Love Theme"  (Eddie DeLange, Irving Mills, Will Hudson, George Duning)  5:04
"Dancin' in the Sky"  (Gene Page)  4:50
"I Feel Like I've Been Livin' (On The Dark Side of the Moon)"  (Ronald Baker)  4:45
"Beyond The Hole in Space"  (Gene Page)  3:28
"When You Wish upon a Star"  (Leigh Harline, Ned Washington)  3:47
"Sho' Like To Ride On Your Star"  (Gene Page, Lamont Dozier)  3:43 	
"Saturn"  (Michael Sembello, Stevie Wonder)  4:45

Personnel
Gene Page - keyboards
Sylvester Rivers - keyboards
Eddie Greene - drums
David T. Walker, Wah Wah Watson, Tim May - guitar
Wilton Felder, Scott Edwards - bass
Greg Phillinganes, Michael Boddicker - Synthesizer
Gary Coleman, Jack Ashford, Paulinho da Costa - percussion
Harry Bluestone -  concertmaster
Ernie Watts - saxophone on "Moonglow and Love Theme"
Jim Gilstrap, John Lehman, Zebara Turnbugh - vocals
Michael Phillips - voice on "Close Encounters of the Third Kind"
Technical
Norman Seeff - Photography

References

External links
 Gene Page-Close Encounters at Discogs

1978 albums
Gene Page albums
Arista Records albums